The  LZ 2 was a German experimental airship constructed by Luftschiffbau Zeppelin and first flown in 1906. It was the true ancestor of later Zeppelin airship designs. The major mistakes made by Kübler in the design of the LZ 1 were not repeated: the designer, Ludwig Dürr, who was to head the design of all subsequent Zeppelins, used triangular-section girders instead of Kübler's flat girders, and elevators instead of a lead weight to control pitch. The life of the LZ 2 was brief, consisting of only two flights. Its near-sister ship, the LZ 3—which first flew on 9 October 1906—was purchased by the German Army and operated as the Z I until 1913. Before being purchased by the Army, LZ 3 made many flights and carried a number of prestigious passengers, including the German Crown Prince.

Specifications

References

Bibliography

1900s German experimental aircraft
Zeppelins
1906 in Germany
Aircraft first flown in 1906